The Old Jewish Cemetery is a historic necropolis-museum situated on 37/39 Ślężna Street, in the southern part of Wrocław (formerly Breslau), Poland. Opened in 1856, the cemetery's eclectic layout features many architectural forms and styles on a monumental scale.

The current shape of the cemetery evolved mostly throughout the 19th century, during the times of the German Empire. The first burial took place in what was then the village of Gabitz (Gajowice), just outside city limits. The cemetery area was then expanded twice. In 1943, the burial ceremonies were abandoned and the necropolis was leased for five years to a gardening center. During World War II, the cemetery became a fierce battleground, the marks of which are still visible on many tombstones. It was inscribed into the register of city monuments in 1975.

Architecture

Most of the cemetery objects were built in second half of the 19th century. They imitate various architectural styles including Ancient, the Middle Ages, Renaissance, Baroque. Great example of Ancient architecture are numerous columns located throughout the cemetery that are symbols of life and eternity. Columns imitating broken trees reflect the tragedy of fragile life and death. Tombstones are signed by bilingual inscriptions, most commonly German and Jewish.

Most common symbols of Jewish culture which can be seen on tombstones are:
 hands – on the tombstones of descendants of Aaron
 oriental tree – ancient symbol of messianic hope
 broken rose – motif of death
 helmet – army officer symbol
 palms – symbols of national sacrifice of Jews

Notable people buried at the cemetery
 Isidor and Neander Alexander – banking family
 Leopold Auerbach – professor in biology and history at the University of Breslau (now University of Wrocław)
 Julius Cohn – professor of botanics
 Heinrich Graetz – professor of history at Wrocław University
 Friederike Kempner – writer
 Ferdinand Lassalle – thinker, labor leader, and social activist who stayed in close contact with Karl Marx and Friedrich Engels

Antisemitic incident

On July 30, 2010, the cemetery was desecrated with swastikas drawings and vulgar graffiti. In addition, some of the gravestones were broken.

Picture gallery

References

21st-century attacks on synagogues and Jewish communal organizations
Antisemitism in Poland
Buildings and structures in Wrocław
Cemetery vandalism and desecration
Wroclaw
Jews and Judaism in Wrocław